Chencha (also known as Dincha) is a town in southern Ethiopia.

Based on figures from the Central Statistical Agency of Ethiopia published in 2005, Chencha has an estimated total population of 10,488 consisting of 4,750 men and 5,738 women. The 1994 national census reported this town had a total population of 5,787 of whom 2,630 were males and 3,157 were females. It is one of three towns in Chencha woreda.

History 
Chencha had been the capital of Gamo-Gofa province until those offices were transferred to the more accessible city of Arba Minch in 1962. It has been the administrative center of Chencha woreda since at least 1964. Chencha is currently divided into Chencha town administration and Chencha Zuria woredas (the surrounding as a new woreda with its full governmental structures) and Ezo woreda, formerly among the kebeles in the chencha woreda. The town of Checha is known for traditional clothing of Shema as it includes the Dorze and other communities with traditional weaving undertakings. Chencha is a temperate climate zone with the potential and current production capacity of fruits and vegetables, different kinds of root plants, cereals, and timber trees. The town of Chencha is a tourist attracting place with the endowed beauty of nature and the topography of the town.  

Dejazmach Beyene Merid had established his seat as governor of Gamo-Gofa at Chencha by 1935, when he was visited by missionaries and a German expedition.
Chencha is known for its tall bamboo houses. Especially older ones can be up to 5 metres. In former times an ostrich egg used to be placed at the top. The life span of a bamboo house is about 60 years and more. They may be carried to a new site if rotting parts or termites become a problem.

Notes 

Populated places in the Southern Nations, Nationalities, and Peoples' Region